Stuart Richard Abbott MBE (born 3 June 1978) is a South African born rugby union footballer who played centre for London Wasps and England.

Abbott was born in Cape Town, South Africa. His mother was English. He was educated at Western Province Prep School and Bishops, where he says he was caned. Springbok centre Robbie Fleck, and Selborne Boome went to the same school. He took a degree in economics at Stellenbosch University and played for the Northern Free State Griffons in the Currie Cup. He later played for Western Province and South Africa U23

During the 1999 World Cup, Abbott signed for English club Leicester Tigers, who had lost several players to international duty, and made two appearances, on the recommendation of former Tigers and Springbok fly-half Joel Stransky.

In 2001 he played for the South African Super 12 side Stormers. In November 2001 Abbott was signed by English club Wasps. He rocketed to prominence in 2002–03 as a prime force in the team that won the Zurich Premiership, he repeated this for 2003–04 when the club reached the finals of both the Heineken Cup and the end-of-season Zurich Premiership playoffs. Wasps won both finals and Abbott scored a try in both. He formed an exciting centre partnership with Fraser Waters.

He turned down an approach from South Africa coach Rudolf Straeuli prior to the World Cup but decided to play for England. Abbott scored on his England debut when he scored one of the five tries in England's 43–9 Rugby World Cup warm up match with Wales at the Millennium Stadium in August 2003. After impressing again in a pre-World Cup trial against France two weeks later, was selected in England's World Cup squad.

In 2003, he appeared in three Rugby World Cup games, adding a second try in the runaway win over Uruguay. England went on to win the World Cup and with his teammates Abbott was appointed an MBE in the 2004 New Year Honours. He missed out on the 2004 Six Nations Championship through injury but showed his class for his club, earning his call up for the 2004 summer tour. He struggled with injuries after the World Cup and broke his leg in 2005 in a Heineken Cup game between Wasps and Biarritz.
He enjoyed a very successful period at London Wasps winning the Heineken Cup, Zurich Premiership and in his last season there, the Powergen Cup.

In 2006, he joined the newly-promoted Harlequins for the 2006–07 season, but only made 17 appearances for them. On 24 October 2007 Abbott announced his retirement due to a shoulder injury.

In May 2008 Abbott was announced Backs Coach at Rosslyn Park FC, who finished second in the 2008/2009 season.

References

External links 
 England profile
 Harlequins profile
 Sporting heroes
 Wasps profile
 Profile at scrum.com

1978 births
Living people
Alumni of Diocesan College, Cape Town
England international rugby union players
English rugby union players
Harlequin F.C. players
Leicester Tigers players
Members of the Order of the British Empire
Rugby union players from Cape Town
South African people of English descent
South African rugby union players
Stellenbosch University alumni
Stormers players
Wasps RFC players
Western Province (rugby union) players
Rugby union centres